The Ficke Block  is a historic building located in downtown Davenport, Iowa, United States. It was individually listed on the National Register of Historic Places in 1983. In 2020 it was included as a contributing property in the Davenport Downtown Commercial Historic District.

History
The building at 309 Harrison Street is associated with a prominent Davenport Attorney Charles August (C.A.) Ficke. He was responsible for building or renovating numerous properties in the downtown area. The block, which has the appearance of two separate buildings, was built in 1899 to house the McCormick Division of the International Harvesting Company of America and apartments on the upper floors. The southern storefront (307) became the L.R. Wareham pool hall in 1915 and remained a pool hall through the 1940s. The north side (309) was home to a variety of businesses that included: City Fuel and Lumber Company, Bee Jay Tire Service, the Savoy Café, the Colorado Restaurant, the Old Timer (tavern), and the Three Hundred Nine Tavern. It currently houses the Berg Apartments.

Architecture
The Ficke Block is a four-story, brick structure built on a stone foundation. It features many details found in late Victorian architecture: rusticated, semi-circular window arches on the third floor, and flat stone lintels over the paired windows on the fourth floor recall the Romanesque style. A pair of two-story bay windows with embossed garland swags, wrought iron balconies, and ornate cornices reflect the Queen Anne style. The storefronts, however, have been significantly altered.

References

Commercial buildings completed in 1899
Victorian architecture in Iowa
Apartment buildings in Davenport, Iowa
Commercial buildings on the National Register of Historic Places in Iowa
Apartment buildings on the National Register of Historic Places in Iowa
National Register of Historic Places in Davenport, Iowa
Individually listed contributing properties to historic districts on the National Register in Iowa